Malik Muhammad Uzair Khan is a Pakistani politician who had been a member of the National Assembly of Pakistan, from January 2014 to May 2018.

Early life
He was born to Sumaira Malik.

Political career
He was elected to the National Assembly of Pakistan as a candidate of Pakistan Muslim League (N) from Constituency NA-69 (Khushab-I) in by-election held in 2014. He received 92,805 votes and defeated a candidate of Pakistan Tehreek-e-Insaf. The seat became vacant after his mother Sumaira Malik who won in 2013 general election was disqualified to continue in office because of fake degree case.

References

Living people
Pakistan Muslim League (N) politicians
Punjabi people
Pakistani MNAs 2013–2018
Year of birth missing (living people)